Gazoryctra ganna is a moth of the family Hepialidae. It is found in Sweden, Finland, Russia (Siberia), France, Switzerland, Austria, Italy and Kazakhstan.

The wingspan is 31–34 mm for males and 38–39 mm for females.

References

External links

Lepiforum.de

Moths described in 1808
Hepialidae
Moths of Europe
Moths of Asia
Taxa named by Jacob Hübner